Detective K: Secret of the Virtuous Widow is a 2011 South Korean film based on the novel by Kim Tak-hwan, starring Kim Myung-min in the lead role. It was the 4th best selling Korean film of 2011.

Plot
In 1782, 16 years after Jeongjo became the King of Joseon, a series of murders occurs. King Jeongjo believes the murders may belong to a conspiracy by government officials to cover up tributary payments. King Jeongjo then gives Detective K (Kim Myung-min) a secret order to find out who is behind the killings.

When Detective K goes to question the jailed city governor, he discovers that the governor has just been murdered. Detective K then pulls out the murder weapon: a long metal needle that is jammed into the back of the governor's head. Furthermore, Detective K discovers a clue to the murderer's identity. Remnants of the regional Wolfsbane flower are found near the long metal needle. But, while Detective K is holding the murder weapon, prison guards come into the cell and assume that Detective K murdered the city governor. Now imprisoned, Detective K awakes to find dog fancier Seo-pil (Oh Dal-su) standing over him. Seo-pil helps Detective K escape from prison.

Because of this incident, King Jeongjo demotes Detective K and reassigns him to Jeokseong to investigate the case of a woman thought to have killed herself after the death of her husband. But, this reassignment is more of a ruse for Detective K to get to Jeokseong – the area where the Wolfsbane flower blooms.

As Detective K and Seo-pil investigate in Jeokseong, they come across lady Han Kaek-ju (Han Ji-min), who works as a commission agent and controls large groups of merchants. Detective K and Seo-Pil suspect that Han Kaek-ju and the head of the Noron political party Minister Im (Lee Jae-yong) are embezzling taxes to pay off politicians. Meanwhile, Detective K also investigates the case of the woman who reportedly committed suicide after the death of her husband and comes to the conclusion that these two cases are somehow related.

Cast
 Kim Myung-min as Detective K
 Han Ji-min as Han Kaek-ju
 Oh Dal-su as Han Seo-pil
 Lee Jae-yong as Minister Im
 Woo Hyeon as Mr. Bang
 Ye Soo-jung as Im's wife
 Choi Moo-sung as medical guru
 Jung In-gi as magistrate
 Lee Seol-gu as servant 4
 Choi Jae-sup as Lee Bang
 Moon Kyung-min as old blacksmith
 Kim Tae-hoon as Im Geo-seon
 Nam Sung-jin as King Jeongjo
 Yang Han-yeol as Young slave
 Lee Chae-eun as Young slave
 Kim Young-hoon as Priest

Release
The film was released in South Korea on January 27, 2011. It received a theatrical run in 10 cities in the U.S. and Canada in March 2011, including Los Angeles, San Francisco, Atlanta, Seattle, Chicago, Dallas, Hawaii and Vancouver. It was also sold to Australia, China, Taiwan, Thailand, Germany, Austria, and Switzerland, and screened at the Hawaii International Film Festival.

Sequels

The sequel was released in February 2015. Kim Myung-min and Oh Dal-su reprised their roles, and are joined by Lee Yeon-hee as a femme fatale.

A third film, Detective K: Secret of the Living Dead, was released on February 8, 2018.

References

External links
  
 Detective K: Secret of the Virtuous Widow at Naver 
 
 
 

2010s adventure comedy films
South Korean detective films
2011 films
Films based on South Korean novels
Films set in 1782
South Korean adventure comedy films
Showbox films
2010s South Korean films